Juho Pekka Kokko (28 May 1865, Kontiolahti – 27 May 1939) was a Finnish schoolteacher, farmer and politician. He was a member of the Parliament of Finland from 1913 to 1922, representing the Agrarian League.

References

1865 births
1939 deaths
People from Kontiolahti
People from Kuopio Province (Grand Duchy of Finland)
Centre Party (Finland) politicians
Members of the Parliament of Finland (1913–16)
Members of the Parliament of Finland (1916–17)
Members of the Parliament of Finland (1917–19)
Members of the Parliament of Finland (1919–22)
People of the Finnish Civil War (White side)
Finnish schoolteachers